German Alexandrovich Getsevich (October 28, 1961, Moscow —  September 1, 2021, ib.) was a Russian poet, prose writer, translator.

Biography 
Born October 28, 1961 in Moscow in a family of employees. Mother  Rimma Vasilievna Getsevich, chemical engineer (1938-2008). Father  Alexander Iosifovich Kogan (1921-2019), military dermatologist, candidate of medical sciences, participant of the Great Patriotic War. Stepfather   Boris Grigorievich Milovanov (1925-2010), master pastry chef, head of the shop. German spent his childhood and youth in Sokolniki District. From 1981 to 1982 he served in the Soviet Army, in the Transcaucasian Military District. Received a medical degree, from 1981 to 2009 he worked for  emergency medical services. He tried to enter the Maxim Gorky Literature Institute, but was not accepted. For the first time, Getsevich's poems were published in 1992.

According to Getsevich, the first poet he knew and fell in love with was Sergei Yesenin. For the first time, Getsevich's poems were published in 1992.

Andrei Voznesensky gave a capacious definition to the work of German Getsevich: He has sunk into the word. He scalps the word, tries to figure out the code of the language, and therefore of life. Even in the traditional poem about the fly, the humming of the spirit is encoded.

References

External links
 Official site

1961 births
2021 deaths
Writers from Moscow
Russian male poets
Soviet male poets
Russian-language poets
Soviet translators
Russian translators
20th-century Russian poets
21st-century Russian poets
Soviet children's writers
Russian children's writers